Dwayne David Blakley (born August 10, 1979) is a former American football tight end. He played professionally for the Atlanta Falcons in the National Football League.

Early life
Blakley was born in Saint Joseph, Missouri. He attended Central High School in St. Joseph, and graduated in 1997. Blakley played college football at the University of Missouri.

Professional career
Blakley was signed by the Kansas City Chiefs as an undrafted free agent in 2002. He played for the Atlanta Falcons from 2004 to 2007.

References

External links
Tennessee Titans bio
databaseFootball.com
Pro Football Reference

1979 births
Living people
American football tight ends
Atlanta Falcons players
Miami Dolphins players
Missouri Tigers football players
Rhein Fire players
San Diego Chargers players
Sportspeople from St. Joseph, Missouri
Tennessee Titans players